The 1971–72 Los Angeles Kings season was the Kings' fifth season of operation in the National Hockey League (NHL). The Kings finished in last place in the West Division and did not qualify for the playoffs.

Regular season

Final standings

Schedule and results

Player statistics

Transactions
The Kings were involved in the following transactions during the 1971–72 season.

Trades

Free agent signings

Waivers

Intra-league Draft

Reverse Draft

Draft picks
Los Angeles's draft picks at the 1971 NHL Amateur Draft held at the Queen Elizabeth Hotel in Montreal, Quebec.

See also
1971–72 NHL season

References

External links
 

Los
Los
Los Angeles Kings seasons
Los
Los